Lt Col William Edward Harrison  (14 August 1875 – 23 March 1937) was an English cricketer active from the mid–1890s to the early–1900s. Born at Warwick, Warwickshire, he made two appearances in first-class cricket, but was mostly associated with minor counties cricket.

The son of William Harrison (who also played first-class cricket), Harrison made his debut in minor counties cricket for Staffordshire against Worcestershire in the 1895 Minor Counties Championship at Stoke-on-Trent. He made eight further minor counties appearances for Staffordshire, the last coming in 1900 against Northamptonshire. He made his two appearances in first-class cricket in 1901 for BJT Bosanquet's XI during their tour to North America, playing both matches against the Gentlemen of Philadelphia at Merion and Germantown. He scored a total of 37 runs in his two matches, with a high score of 15.

He was elected to Staffordshire County Council in 1913, made a County Alderman in 1924, and served as the chairman of the county council from 1927–1937. He was made High Sheriff of Staffordshire in 1927. He died at Ruthin Castle in Wales on 23 March 1937. His son-in-law Charles Andreae also played first-class cricket.

References

External links

1875 births
1937 deaths
People from Warwick
English cricketers
Staffordshire cricketers
Councillors in Staffordshire
Members of the Order of the British Empire
High Sheriffs of Staffordshire
B. J. T. Bosanquet's XI cricketers